Asleep in the Back is the debut studio album by English rock band Elbow, first released in the United Kingdom on 7 May 2001, and in the United States on 22 January 2002. The title track, "Asleep in the Back", was only included as a bonus track on later editions of the album after it had been released as a single and became the band's first Top 20 hit. The album release came in four different versions: the 12-track version, two 11-track versions only featuring either "Asleep in the Back" (later editions) or "Can't Stop" (UK version) and a 10-track version including neither of them. The record was shortlisted for the Mercury Prize in 2001.

Though Asleep in the Back was the first Elbow album to be released, it was not the first to be recorded. An album's worth of recorded material had been scrapped by the band several years earlier after they were dropped by their first major label, Island Records.

A 2CD/1DVD deluxe edition of the album was released in the UK on 2 November 2009. The release included almost all tracks of the near impossible to find The Noisebox EP: a live version of "George Lassoes the Moon" was included instead of the studio version.

Critical reception

Q listed Asleep in the Back as one of the best 50 albums of 2001.

Track listing

Japanese Bonus Track

Double 12" vinyl album

2009 Deluxe Edition
Disc one Same as 12-track version.

Disc two (bonus disc)

Disc three (DVD)

Release history

Singles
In the UK, there were four singles released from the album:
 "Red" (23 April 2001)
 "Powder Blue" (9 July 2001)
 "Newborn" (8 October 2001)
 "Asleep in the Back"/"Coming Second" (4 February 2002)

Also, three EPs preceded the album's release, all of which included versions of songs that later appeared on Asleep in the Back:
 The Noisebox EP (1 January 1998)
 The Newborn EP (7 August 2000)
 The Any Day Now EP (Ugly Man release with 4 tracks) (23 January 2001)
 V2 also released this EP with 5 tracks (26 February 2001)

Personnel
Elbow
Guy Garvey – Lead vocals, backing vocals, acoustic and electric guitars, percussion, analogue synth, wine glasses, harmonica, wybercron
Mark Potter – Electric and acoustic guitars, backing vocals
Craig Potter – Piano, organ, backing vocals, analogue synth, percussion, wine glasses, keyboards
Pete Turner – Bass guitar, analogue synth, backing vocals, wine glasses
Richard Jupp – Drums, percussion, backing vocals

Additional musicians
The Elbow Choir – Vocals (9,10)
Danny Evans – Percussion Loops (1)
Ben Hillier – Percussion (2), Backing Vocals (10)
Ian Burdge – Cello (2), Musical Director (6)
Francoise Lemoignan – Saxophone (4)
Bob Sastri – Brass (5), French Horn (6)
Nick Coen – Brass (5)
Martin Field – Bassoon (6)
Stuart King – Clarinet (6), Bass Clarinet (6)
Matthew Gunner – French Horn (6)
Jonathan Snowden – Flute (6), Alto Flute (6)
Dominic Kelly – Cor Anglais (6)

Credits
Production
Elbow and Danny Evans (1)
Elbow (4,8,12)
Ben Hillier and Elbow (2,3,5,6,9,10)
Steve Osborne (7,11)
Woodwind Arrangement on Track 6 - Ian Burdge and Elbow
Recording
Danny Evans (1)
Ben Hillier (2,3,4,5,6,9,10,12)
Andrea Wright (2,3,4,5,6,9,10,12)
Elbow (3,8,9,12)
Steve Lloyd (4)
Ed Chadwick (6)
Danton Supple (7,11)
Mixing
Danny Evans (1,8)
Ben Hillier (2,4,5,6,7,9,10,12)
Andrea Wright (2,4,5,6,7,9,10,12)
Ed Chadwick (6)
Steve Osborne (11)
Clare Lewis (11)
Bruno Ellington (11)

References

Elbow (band) albums
2001 debut albums
Albums produced by Ben Hillier
Albums produced by Steve Osborne
V2 Records albums